Adarotene is a bioactive retinoid.

References

Retinoids